Kampanis (Karadja Kadar) is a village south of the city of Kilkis in the Kilkis regional unit, Greece. It is part of the municipal unit Gallikos and has a population of 1,170 people (2011). The community Kampanis (pop. 1,208 in 2011) consists of the villages Kampanis and Mylos. Kampanis was named after a Greek army officer who died in the area during the Macedonian War of 1913–14.

References 

Populated places in Kilkis (regional unit)